The cuneiform gi sign is a common multi-use sign of the Epic of Gilgamesh, the 1350 BC Amarna letters, and other cuneiform texts. It also has a sumerogrammic usage for GI in the Epic of Gilgamesh. The structure of the cuneiform sign is like its twin, Zi (cuneiform), .

The "gi" sign has the syllabic usage for ge and gi, and a sumerogram usage for GI. Alphabetically "gi" can be used for g ("g" can be interchanged with "k", or "q"); and "gi"/"ge" can be used for i, or e. In Akkadian, all 4 vowels, a, e, i, u are interchangeable with each other.

Epic of Gilgamesh usage
The gi sign usage in the Epic of Gilgamesh is as follows: ge-(4 times); gi-(17), GI-(20 times).

References

Moran, William L. 1987, 1992. The Amarna Letters. Johns Hopkins University Press, 1987, 1992. 393 pages.(softcover)
 Parpola, 1971. The Standard Babylonian Epic of Gilgamesh, Parpola, Simo, Neo-Assyrian Text Corpus Project, c 1997, Tablet I thru Tablet XII, Index of Names, Sign List, and Glossary-(pp. 119–145), 165 pages.

Cuneiform signs